Fabrice Herzog (born 9 December 1994) is a Swiss professional ice hockey forward currently playing for EV Zug in the National League (NL). He was drafted 142nd overall by the Toronto Maple Leafs in the 2013 NHL Entry Draft.

Playing career
As a youth, Herzog played local team Pikes EHC Oberthurgau before joining the junior program of EV Zug. In his second season of Elite Junior A, Herzog made his professional debut with EV Zug in the 2012–13 season, appearing in 20 games for 4 points.

After his selection to the Maple Leafs in the off-season, Herzog opted to play major junior hockey in North America in the Quebec Major Junior Hockey League after he was selected 42nd overall in the 2013 CHL Import Draft by the  Québec Remparts. Herzog adapted quickly with the Remparts and was amongst the team's top scorers with 58 points in 61 games. Following an opening-round post-season defeat, Herzog continued his 2013–14 season by agreeing to an amateur try-out contract with the Maple Leafs American Hockey League affiliate, the Toronto Marlies, on 3 April 2014. Herzog featured in five scoreless games with the Marlies.

On 6 June 2014, without a contract offer from the Maple Leafs, Herzog opted to continue his development in his homeland, returning to EV Zug on a one-year deal. During the 2014–15 season, Herzog agreed to a two-year contract with top NLA club, ZSC Lions to commence the following year.

Following a breakout season in which he posted a career-high 22 points in his debut campaign with the Lions in 2015–16, Herzog agreed to a two-year contract extension on 29 April 2016.

On 16 November 2018, Herzog signed a two-year contract with HC Davos for the 2019–20 season and through the 2020–21 season.

On February 1, 2021, Herzog agreed to a two-year deal to return to EV Zug for the 2021/22 and 2022/23 season.

On 18 February 2021, Herzog was suspended for eight games following a hit to the head of SCB's Eric Blum on 14 February 2021. He also received a CHF 11,150 fine.

On 4 November 2021, he was suspended for another five games following a cross-check against HC Fribourg-Gottéron's Mauro Dufner on 31 October 2021 and fined CHF 7,700.

International play
Herzog first played in the Swiss national program at the 2012 IIHF World U18 Championships. He later made his full international debut after he was selected to the Swiss national team to participate at the 2017 IIHF World Championship in Germany/France. Herzog impressively scored the game-tying and overtime winning goal for Switzerland in a round-robin comeback win over Canada on 13 May 2017.

Career statistics

Regular season and playoffs

International

References

External links

1994 births
Living people
HC Davos players
Swiss ice hockey forwards
Swiss expatriate ice hockey people
Swiss expatriate sportspeople in Canada
Olympic ice hockey players of Switzerland
People from Frauenfeld
Quebec Remparts players
Toronto Maple Leafs draft picks
Toronto Marlies players
Ice hockey players at the 2018 Winter Olympics
Ice hockey players at the 2022 Winter Olympics
ZSC Lions players
EV Zug players
Sportspeople from Thurgau